(former name; Ryoko Kobayashi, 小林 涼子) is a former Japanese football player. She played for Japan national team.

Club career
Uno was born in Sagamihara on 9 November 1975. She joined Yomiuri Beleza (later NTV Beleza) in 1990. The club won L.League championship for 4 years in a row until 1993. She was selected Best Eleven for 3 years in a row from 1991 to 1993. In 2000, she moved to YKK Tohoku Ladies SC Flappers (later TEPCO Mareeze). In 2007, she retired.

National team career
In May 1991, when Uno was 15 years old, she was selected Japan national team for 1991 AFC Championship in Fukuoka. At this competition, on 3 June, she debuted against Singapore. She also played at 1993 AFC Championship. She was a member of Japan for 1995 World Cup. She played 6 games for Japan until 1996.

National team statistics

References

External links
 

1975 births
Living people
People from Sagamihara
Asia University (Japan) alumni
Association football people from Kanagawa Prefecture
Japanese women's footballers
Japan women's international footballers
Nadeshiko League players
Nippon TV Tokyo Verdy Beleza players
TEPCO Mareeze players
1995 FIFA Women's World Cup players
Women's association football defenders